The 1989 Yale Bulldogs football team represented Yale University in the 1989 NCAA Division I-AA football season. The Bulldogs were led by 25th-year head coach Carmen Cozza, played their home games at the Yale Bowl and finished tied for first place in the Ivy League with a 6–1 record, 8–2 overall.

Schedule

References

Football
Yale Bulldogs football seasons
Ivy League football champion seasons
Yale Bulldogs football